Sorelia is a monotypic beetle genus in the family Cerambycidae described by Lane in 1965. Its only species, Sorelia ferruginea, was described by Ernst Fuchs in 1964.

References

Acanthoderini
Beetles described in 1964
Monotypic beetle genera